Ancistrocerus longispinosus is a species of potter wasp, belonging to the family Vespidae, subfamily Eumeninae.

Etymology
The Latin genus name Ancistrocerus means hooked horn. for the back-curved last segments of the antennae characteristic of males. The species name longispinosus means with long thorns.

Subspecies
Subspecies include: 
Ancistrocerus longispinosus longispinosus (Saussure, 1855)
Ancistrocerus longispinosus gazelloides Giuglia, 1945 (endemic to Corsica and Sardinia) 
Ancistrocerus longispinosus hellenicus Blüthgen, 1957

Distribution
This species is present in Southern Europe (Albania, Balearic Islands, Croatia, Cyprus, Dodecanese Islands, European Turkey, France, Greece, Italy, Portugal, Spain and Ukraine), in the Near East and in North Africa.

Description
These nonpetiolate eumenine wasps has a transverse ridge at the bending summit of the first metasomal tergum and a low and opaque propodeal lamella completely fused to the submarginal carina. The second sternite is more or less concave at the base, the propodeum is black and the wings are darkened at the apex. They show four yellow abdominal bands, Legs are mainly yellow.

Biology
These wasp have a solitary lifestyle. Mothers nest alone, usually utilizing pre-existing cavities. They provide larvae with preserved preys (mainly Lepidopteran, Coleopteran and Hymenopteran larvae) that they paralyze with their sting.

Bibliography
Guido Pagliano (2003) Naturalista Siciliano, Giornale di Scienze Naturali. Ricerche imenotterologiche nelle isole di Lampedusa e Pantelleria, Volume: 27 Pages: 115-149 
Horst-Günter Woydak (2001) Natur und Heimat Die solitären Faltenwespen: Eumenidae (Lehmwespen) und Masaridae (Honigwespen im Westfälischen Museum für Naturkunde Münster, Volume: 61 Pages: 85-95 
Antonio Giordani Soika (1966) Boll.Mus.Civ.Stor.nat.Venezia Notulae vespidologicae XXIV. Ancistrocerus plaeartici nuovi o poco noti., Volume: 17 Pages: 81-88

References

Potter wasps
Insects described in 1855